The 1981–82 NC State Wolfpack men's basketball team represented North Carolina State University as a member of the Atlantic Coast Conference during the 1981–82 men's college basketball season. Led by second-year head coach Jim Valvano, the Wolfpack played their home games at Reynolds Coliseum in Raleigh, North Carolina. NC State finished with a .500 record in ACC play (7–7) and reached the semifinals of the ACC Tournament. The team received a bid to the NCAA tournament as No. 7 seed in the Mideast region. NC State was defeated by No. 10 seed Chattanooga in the opening round to finish the season with an overall record of 22–10.

Roster

Schedule

|-
!colspan=12 style=| ACC Tournament

|-
!colspan=12 style=| NCAA Tournament

Rankings

References

NC State Wolfpack men's basketball seasons
Nc State
Nc State
NC State Wolfpack men's basketball
NC State Wolfpack men's basketball